John Garry Clifford (1942 – 26 March 2014) was an American historian and professor of Political Science at the University of Connecticut.

Life

Born in Massachusetts, he earned his B.A. from Williams College (1964) and his Ph.D. in history from Indiana University (1969). His doctoral advisor was the historian Robert H. Ferrell. He also taught at the University of Tennessee and Dartmouth College and has participated in two National Endowment for the Humanities seminars for high school teachers at the Franklin D. Roosevelt Presidential Library and Museum.

He taught at the University of Connecticut, with an interest in American diplomacy.  Clifford has served on the editorial board of Diplomat History as well as on the editorial board of the Modern War Series of the University Press of Kansas.

He was until his death, writing a book on FDR and American intervention in World War II.

Awards
 1971 Frederick Jackson Turner Award

Works

References

External links
"Plattsburg Idea", New York archives, fall 2005

American historians
1942 births
2014 deaths